Julie Ménard is Canadian actress from Montreal, Quebec.  Her work has been mainly shown in francophone Quebec.

Filmography
 1998: Now or Never (Aujourd'hui ou jamais) 
 2000: Willie (TV series)
 2001: So Faraway and Blue
 2002: Le Collectionneur
 2004-2008: Caméra café (TV series) as Josée Gamache
 2004: La Vie rêvée de Mario Jean (TV)
 2005: Horloge biologique
 2005: Les Invincibles (TV series)
 2005: Audition (L'Audition)
 2010: C.A. (TV series) as Lily la voisine
 2011: lol:-)  (TV)
 2013: Trauma (TV series) as Sylvie Bastien, 2 episodes 
 2016: Votez Bougon as Petronia Chagnon
 2017: Cross My Heart as Simone St-Jean
 2018: Le jeu (TV series) as Pédopsychiatre, 1 episode 
 2018: District 31 (TV series) as Christine Power, recurring role 
 2020: Les Mecs (TV series) as Noémie, main cast

References

External links
 

Living people
Canadian film actresses
Canadian television actresses
Actresses from Montreal
Year of birth missing (living people)